Kenneth Meredith (born 22 January 1963) is an Australian gymnast. He competed in seven events at the 1988 Summer Olympics.

References

External links
 

1963 births
Living people
Australian male artistic gymnasts
Olympic gymnasts of Australia
Gymnasts at the 1988 Summer Olympics
Place of birth missing (living people)
Commonwealth Games medallists in gymnastics
Commonwealth Games silver medallists for Australia
Commonwealth Games bronze medallists for Australia
Gymnasts at the 1990 Commonwealth Games
20th-century Australian people
21st-century Australian people
Medallists at the 1990 Commonwealth Games